Run, stylized as RUN, is the fifth studio album by Japanese producer tofubeats, and his fourth on a major label. It was released on October 3, 2018, through Warner Music Japan subsidiary unBORDE.

Release 
The album was released on October 3, 2018. The album was preceded by multiple singles, including "Immortal Love", which was used in the show Den'ei Shōjo - Video Girl Ai 2018, "RUN", and "River", which was used as the theme song for the movie Asako I & II. A remixes album, titled RUN REMIXES, was released on September 4, 2020.

Track listing

Charts

References 

Japanese-language albums
Tofubeats albums
Unborde albums
2018 albums